The Ghana cricket team toured Rwanda in August 2021 to play a five-match Twenty20 International (T20I) series at the Gahanga International Cricket Stadium in Kigali. The series provided preparation for both teams ahead of the 2021 ICC Men's T20 World Cup Africa Sub-Regional Qualifier, that was also played in Kigali in October 2021.

The two games on the first day of the series were shared, with Rwanda winning the opener by one wicket before Ghana took victory in the second game by two wickets. After another win for each side, Ghana clinched the series 3–2 by winning the final game by 7 wickets, helped by 80 not out from player of the series Amoluk Singh.

There was some confusion regarding the result of the fourth match, which saw Rwanda reach 30/1 from five overs in their run-chase, before rain prevented any further play. Instead of Ghana winning via the DLS method, the Rwandan team conceded the match.

Squads

Rwanda also named Damascene Abizera and Ignace Ntirenganya as reserves for the series.

T20I series

1st T20I

2nd T20I

3rd T20I

4th T20I

5th T20I

References

External links
 Series home at ESPNcricinfo

Associate international cricket competitions in 2021